Wheeler L. Baker was the ninth President of Hargrave Military Academy, and was a career U.S. Marine.

Career
Baker enlisted in the United States Marine Corps in 1958, and served as an enlisted Marine for nine years. From 1962 to 1964, he served a tour as a drill instructor. Upon being presented with the opportunity to obtain a commission, Baker accepted and graduated from Officer Candidate School as an honor graduate. From January to July 1973, while a captain, Baker attended Amphibious Warfare School (now called Expeditionary Warfare School), one of a total of 77 recipients of the Purple Heart in the class. A notable classmate of Baker's in that AWS class was John J. McGinty, who had been awarded the Medal of Honor in 1968.

Baker's total of thirty-nine-and-a-half years of service include commanding a Reconnaissance company in Vietnam and the 1st Reconnaissance Battalion from July 6, 1983 to June 25, 1985. He was promoted to Colonel in 1989, and in 1990 served in Operation: Desert Storm as commander of the 22nd Marine Expeditionary Unit. In 1993, Baker published his first book, Crisis Management: A Model For Managers. A year later, Baker served as chief of staff of the 1st Marine Division in Somalia.

Wheeler Baker graduated from the University of Tampa with a bachelor's degree in Economics in 1972, going on to obtain a Master of Arts in International Affairs from the Catholic University of America. He studied at the Naval War College and Salve Regina College and earned a PhD in Organizational Learning and Instructional Techniques at the University of New Mexico in 1998.

In his final assignment in the Marine Corps, Baker was chairman of the Naval Science Department at the University of New Mexico. He retired from the U.S. Marine Corps in 1997, and was recruited by Hargrave Military Academy in Chatham, Virginia that same year.

President of Hargrave 
Baker served as provost until the sitting President of Hargrave, Colonel John W. Ripley, resigned on March 18, 1999. On June 24, 2011, Colonel Baker retired as President of Hargrave, transferring leadership of the school to Brigadier General Doyle Broome Jr., a retired US Army officer and the first flag officer to be President of HMA. Six years later, on June 2, 2017, Broome's retirement was announced effective May 31, 2017. To ensure Hargrave would not be without vital senior leadership while the search for a new President went on, Baker agreed to return from retirement to serve as Hargrave's interim President.

Effective dates of promotion

Awards 
 

During his career in the Marine Corps, Baker was decorated many times, receiving awards from both the United States of America, the Republic of Vietnam, and Kuwait. Among his awards are the Legion of Merit, which he received three times, the Bronze Star with Valor Device, the Purple Heart, the Joint Service Commendation Medal, Navy & Marine Corps Commendation Medal with one bronze star device and one Valor Device, the Vietnam Service Medal with four campaign stars, the National Defense Service Medal, the Armed Forces Expeditionary Medal, the Humanitarian Service Medal, the Combat Action Ribbon, the Marine Corps Recruiting Ribbon, the Navy and Marine Corps Sea Service Deployment Ribbon with three campaign stars, the Vietnam Campaign Medal, and the Kuwait Liberation Medal. Additionally, Baker received the Navy & Marine Corps Parachutist Badge and qualified as a combat diver.

Bibliography
 Crisis Management: A Model for Managers, 1993, by Wheeler L. Baker, 
 We'll All Die As Marines: One Marine's Journey From Private To Colonel, 2012, by Jim Bathhurst
 Cadence, 2009, by Hargrave Military Academy Yearbook Staff
 Years of Change; Years of Growth: A History of Hargrave Military Academy 1970-2003, 2004, by Mary M. Tallent, OCLC 191884528

Education 
 1972 Bachelor of Arts in Economics, University of Tampa, Tampa, Florida
 Master of Arts in International Affairs, Catholic University of America, Washington, D.C.
 Master of Science in Strategic Decision Making, Naval War College, Newport, Rhode Island
 Master of Science in Management, Salve Regina College, Newport, Rhode Island
 1998 Doctor of Philosophy, Organizational Learning and Instructional Technologies, University of New Mexico, Albuquerque, New Mexico

References

1938 births
Living people
Educators from Virginia
United States Marine Corps personnel of the Vietnam War
Catholic University of America alumni
Naval War College alumni
Recipients of the Legion of Merit
Salve Regina University alumni
University of Tampa alumni
University of New Mexico alumni
United States Marine Corps colonels